Sorrento Valley station is a commuter rail station in the Sorrento Valley neighborhood of San Diego, California that is on the NCTD COASTER commuter rail line. The station is served by MTS COASTER Connection shuttles to the businesses east of the station, the community of Torrey Pines, University of California, San Diego, and the Westfield UTC Mall.

On October 7, 2013, the Amtrak Pacific Surfliner began stopping at four COASTER stations: Carlsbad Village, Carlsbad Poinsettia, Encinitas and Sorrento Valley. The Carlsbad Poinsettia and Encinitas stops were discontinued on October 9, 2017. The Carlsbad Village and Sorrento Valley stops were dropped on October 8, 2018, due to changes with the cross-ticketing arrangement with COASTER and NCTD.

References

External links

COASTER Stations

North County Transit District stations
Railway stations in the United States opened in 1995
Former Amtrak stations in California
Railway stations in San Diego